Paku Alam VI was Duke (Adipati) of Pakualaman between 1901 and 1902, as one of the shortest duration rulers in the history of Paku Alam and the Yogyakarta palaces.
Pakualaman (also written Paku Alaman) became a small hereditary Duchy within the Sultanate of Yogyakarta, as a mirror-image of Mangkunegaran in the territory of the Susuhunanate of Surakarta

The son of Paku Alam V, Paku Alam VI was buried at Girigondo.

Subsequent list of rulers
 Paku Alam VII, 1903 — 1938
 Paku Alam VIII, 1938 — 1999
 Paku Alam IX, 1999 — 2015
 Paku Alam X, 2015 —

Family history

Notes

1902 deaths
Dukes of Pakualaman
Pakualaman
Burials at Girigondo
Indonesian royalty
Indonesian Freemasons